Edward "Ned" McKendry (born 4 July 1994) is a competition swimmer who represented Australia at the 2012 Summer Olympics in London.  McKendry swam in the preliminary heats and final of the 4×200-metre freestyle relay event as a member of the Australian team, which finished fifth with a time of 5:20.40.

References

External links
 
 

1994 births
Living people
Australian male freestyle swimmers
Olympic swimmers of Australia
Swimmers from Brisbane
Swimmers at the 2012 Summer Olympics
Swimmers at the 2014 Commonwealth Games
Commonwealth Games gold medallists for Australia
Commonwealth Games medallists in swimming
21st-century Australian people
Medallists at the 2014 Commonwealth Games